A P-Patch is a parcel of property used for gardening; the term is specific to Seattle, Washington. The "P" originally stood for "Picardo", after the family who owned Picardo Farm in Seattle's Wedgwood neighborhood, part of which became the original P-Patch. (A folk etymology attributes it to "pea patch".)

One of the more unique P-Patch locations is atop the Mercer Street parking garage at the Seattle Center, which has . It opened in 2012 and was slated for closure in 2020, but was saved after community protests.

List of P-Patches
Jackson Park, 10th Ave. N.E. & N.E. 133rd St.
Pinehurst, 12th Ave. N.E. & N.E. 115th St.
Evanston, Evanston Ave. N. & N. 102nd St.
Ballard, 25th Ave. N.W. & N.W. 85th St.
Picardo Farm, 26th Ave. N.E. & N.E. 82nd St.
Burke-Gilman Gardens, 5200 Mithun Pl. N.E.
Magnuson, Sand Point Way N.E. & N.E. 70th St.
Ravenna, 5200 Ravenna Ave. N.E.
Good Shepherd, Bagley Ave. N. & N. 47th St.
University District, 8th Ave. N.E. & N.E. 40th St.
Interbay, 2451 15th Avenue West
Eastlake, 2900 Fairview Ave. E.
Colman Park, 32nd Ave. S. & S. Grand St.
Snoqualmie, 13th Ave. S. & S. Snoqualmie St.
Ferdinand, Columbia Dr. S. & S. Ferdinand St.
Delridge, 5078 25th Ave. S.W.
University Heights Center, 5031 University Way N.E.
Thistle, Martin Luther King Jr. Way S. & S. Cloverdale St.
Judkins, 24th Ave. S. & S. Norman St.
Republican, 20th Ave. E. & E. Republican St.
Alki, 2126 Alki Ave S.W.
Bradner Gardens Park, 29th Ave. S. & S. Grand St.
Estelle Street, 3400 Rainier Ave. S.
Phinney Ridge, 3rd Ave. N.W. & N.W. 60th St.
Ida Mia Garden, E. Madison St., 32nd Ave. E. & Lake Washington Blvd. E.
Fremont West, Baker Ave. N.W. & N.W. 42nd St.
Belltown, Elliott Ave. & Vine St.
Queen Anne, 3rd Ave. N. & Lynn St.
Hillman City, 46th Ave. S. & S. Lucille St.
Hiawatha, S. Dearborn St. & Hiawatha Pl. S.
Squire Park, 14th Ave. & E. Fir St.
Fremont, Woodland Park Ave. N. & N. 39th St.
Cascade, Minor Ave. N. & Thomas St.
Thomas Street Gardens, 1010 E. Thomas St.
Greenwood, 345 N.W. 88th St.
Marra Farm, 4th Ave. S. & S. Director St.
Haller Lake, 13045 1st Ave. N.E.
Greg's Garden (formerly East Ballard), 14th Ave. N.W. & N.W. 54th St.
Immaculate, 18th Ave. & E. Columbia St.
Courtland Place, 36th Ave. S. & S. Spokane St.
Pelican Tea Garden, E. Mercer St. & 19th Ave. E.
Roosevelt, 7012 12th Ave. N.E.
Mad P, 30th Ave. E. & E. Mercer St.
Queen Pea, 5th Ave. N. & Howe St.
Thyme Patch Park, 28th Ave. N.W. & N.W. 58th St.
Beacon Bluff, S. Massachusetts St. & 13th Ave. S.
Longfellow Creek, 25th Ave. S.W. & S.W. Thistle St.
Linden Orchard, Linden Ave. N. & N. 67th St.
Brandon Street Orchard, S. Brandon St. & 47th Ave. S.
Lincoln Park, Fauntleroy Ave. S.W. & S.W. Webster St.
Angel Morgan, S. Morgan St. & 42nd Ave. S.
Maple Leaf, 5th Ave. N.E. & N.E. 103rd St.
Oxbow Park, Corson Ave. S. & S. Eddy St.
Hawkins Garden, E. Jefferson St. & Martin Luther King Jr. Way
Genesee, 41st Ave S.W. &  S.W. Genesee St.
Howell Collective Gardens, 1514 E Howell St

See also
 Allotment (gardening)
 Urban agriculture

References

External links

 Official site, as part of the Seattle Department of Neighborhoods
 P-Patch Trust, a non-profit land trust supporting community gardening in Seattle.

Parks in Seattle
Gardening in the United States
Community gardening in Washington (state)